Kołatka may refer to the following places:
Kołatka, Lubusz Voivodeship (west Poland)
Kołatka, Drawsko County in West Pomeranian Voivodeship (north-west Poland)
Kołatka, Świdwin County in West Pomeranian Voivodeship (north-west Poland)